SISU Basketball Klub is a Danish basketball club from Gentofte, Copenhagen founded in 1954. It takes its name from the Finnish term Sisu. It is the oldest basketball club in Denmark. Both the men's and women's teams still plays in the league's premier championships. The men's team most recent success was reaching the 2000–01 championship's final rounds, where it lost against Forest Hill, while the women's team has resurfaced as a leading force in recent years, winning two doubles in 2011 and 2012 and playing the FIBA Eurocup. 

SISU has also been known as a club with a large and well-functioning youth section with development opportunities for young players in the sport. The Youth Division brings new players to elite teams and the wins  youth championships each year. The club has around 400 members, including 300 in the youth section.

Men's team

Titles
 Danish League (11)
 1961, 1962, 1966, 1967, 1972, 1973, 1976, 1981, 1983, 1984, 1985
 Danish Cup (9)
 1976, 1977, 1984, 1986, 1988, 1989, 1996, 1997, 1998

Notable players

Head coaches
Almir Zeco 2011-2015
Alain Pierre Attallah 2015-2016 
Jim Jabir 2016-2017

Women's team

Titles
 Danish League (18)
 1971, 1972, 1974, 1975, 1976, 1977, 1981, 1982, 1983, 1984, 1985, 1987, 1988, 1990, 1992, 1998, 2011, 2012, 2013, 2014
 Danish Cup (12)
 1983, 1985, 1986, 1987, 1988, 1989, 1999, 2004, 2006, 2010, 2011, 2012, 2013, 2014

Head coaches
Hrannar Hólm 2010-2014
Thomas Ginnerup 2014-2015
Roberto Velosa 2015-2016
Morten Thomsen 2016-2017

References

Basketball teams in Denmark
1954 establishments in Denmark
Basketball teams established in 1954